The 2019–20 Loyola Ramblers men's basketball team represented Loyola University Chicago during the 2019–20 NCAA Division I men's basketball season. The Ramblers, led by eighth-year head coach Porter Moser, played their home games at the Joseph J. Gentile Arena in Chicago, Illinois as members of the Missouri Valley Conference. They finished the season 21–11, 13–5 in MVC play to finish in second place. They lost in the quarterfinals of the MVC tournament to Valparaiso.

Previous season
The Ramblers finished the 2018–19 season 20–14, 12–6 in MVC play to earn a share of the MVC regular season championship. As the No. 1 seed in the MVC tournament, they beat Valparaiso before losing to Bradley in the semifinals. As a regular season conference champion who did not win their tournament championship, the Ramblers received an automatic bid to the National Invitation Tournament as the No. 7 seed in the TCU bracket. There they lost in the first round to Creighton.

Following the season, associate head coach Bryan Mullins was hired as the new head coach at alma mater Southern Illinois.

Offseason

Departures

Incoming transfers

2019 recruiting class

2020 Recruiting class

Roster

Schedule and results

|-
!colspan=9 style=|Exhibition

|-
!colspan=9 style=| Non-conference regular season

|-
!colspan=9 style=| Missouri Valley regular season

|-
!colspan=9 style=| Missouri Valley tournament

References

Loyola
Loyola Ramblers men's basketball seasons
Loyola Ramblers men
Loyola Ramblers men
2020 in Illinois
2020s in Chicago
Loyola Ramblers men
Loyola Ramblers men